State Highway 27 (SH 27) is a state highway in the Waikato region of the North Island of New Zealand. It is an important north–south link along the Waihou/Piako valley and forms an important transport route across the mostly dairy farming Matamata-Piako District.

For its entire length, SH 27 is a single carriageway road with one lane in each direction and at-grade intersections and property access. The New Zealand Transport Agency classifies the highway as an arterial route.

Traffic at Kaihere increased by 31%, from an average of 3,965 vehicles a day in 2008, to 5,182 in 2017 and 5,467 in 2019. In 2017 982 (19%) of those were heavy vehicles, mainly trucks.

The road was gravelled and classified as No.19 Main Highway in 1926.

Major junctions

See also
List of New Zealand state highways
List of roads and highways, for notable or famous roads worldwide

References

27
Transport in Waikato